Nick Blackwell (born 27 October 1990) is a British former professional boxer who competed from 2009 to 2016. He won the English middleweight title in 2010, at the age of twenty, becoming the youngest boxer to do so. In 2011 and 2012 he challenged for the Commonwealth middleweight title, and won the British middleweight title in 2015. Blackwell's career was cut short in 2016 after he was forced to retire due to a serious head injury sustained in the ring.

Professional career
Blackwell turned professional on 26 June 2009, having had no amateur experience and spending his teenage years in the sport as a white-collar boxer. He won his first regional title on 20 November 2010, scoring a ten-round unanimous decision against Harry Matthews to become the youngest ever English middleweight champion at twenty years old. On 18 June 2011, Blackwell challenged Martin Murray for his Commonwealth middleweight title, as well as the vacant British middleweight title. Murray handed Blackwell his first career defeat when the latter was pulled out by his corner at the end of round five. A successful defence of the English middleweight title came on 3 March 2012, with Blackwell stopping Martin Concepcion in four rounds.

On 15 December 2012, Blackwell received a second opportunity at the Commonwealth title, this time against defending champion Billy Joe Saunders; the vacant British title was also on the line. This turned out to be a tough outing for Saunders, as Blackwell forced him to go the full twelve rounds. Saunders nonetheless won a unanimous decision on the judges' scorecards, handing Blackwell his second career defeat. Blackwell travelled to Ukraine on 21 September 2013 to fight for the vacant WBA Continental (Europe) middleweight title, but lost a twelve-round unanimous decision to Max Bursak. During the fight, Blackwell scored a knockdown in the fourth round, and the result was seen by some observers as controversial.

Having begun training with former middleweight world title challenger Gary Lockett, Blackwell made a third attempt at the vacant British title on 30 May 2015 against John Ryder. Blackwell achieved his most significant win, on a prominent stage at The O2 Arena in London, by stopping Ryder in seven rounds to become the British middleweight champion. Two successful title defences were made in the remainder of 2015, against Damon Jones on 25 July (sixth-round stoppage), and Jack Arnfield on 14 November (unanimous decision).

Blackwell vs. Eubank Jr. match and retirement
In his third title defence on 26 March 2016 at Wembley Arena, which would have won him the Lonsdale Belt outright, Blackwell lost to Chris Eubank Jr. In a fast-paced fight, Eubank Jr. dominated the action using hard hooks and uppercuts, which eventually led to a bloody nose and a large swelling above Blackwell's left eye. Following the mid-way point and in the corner between rounds, Chris Eubank Sr. was heard to instruct his son to refrain from punching Blackwell in the head.

In the tenth round the referee summoned the ringside to assess Blackwell, who in turn deemed him unable to continue due to the swelling on his head obstructing his vision, therefore handing Eubank Jr. the victory and title. Some minutes after the fight was stopped, Blackwell was given oxygen and taken out of the arena by stretcher. He was later taken to St Mary's Hospital with bleeding of the skull (outside the brain) and placed in a medically-induced coma, but an operation was not deemed necessary. The following weekend, he was brought out of the coma. In April 2016, Blackwell announced his retirement from boxing via Twitter, but expressed his desire to be involved in the sport in some capacity.

Life after boxing
On 23 May 2016, Blackwell criticised the reaction of Eubank Jr. and his father, following the British middleweight clash which left him fighting for his life. Blackwell was said to have been hurt by the reaction of the Eubanks in the immediate aftermath, despite turning to Twitter to first claim there were no hard feelings. Speaking to ITV's Good Morning Britain, "I was just a little disappointed. If Eubank was in that situation, and he was in a coma, I would want to go and see him. The whole thing with the press conference [which the Eubanks held three days after fight], my family had begged them not to do it and they still went ahead." He added, "Anyone in boxing knows it was more of a tactical thing. He couldn't stop me to the head so he wanted to hit me to the body to try and get rid of me."

Following Blackwell's comments, Eubank Jr. said he was shocked at the criticism he and his father received for holding a press conference when Blackwell was in an induced coma. Eubank Jr. said, "I can understand where this anger and dislike for me can come from. The truth is, I ended the guy's career. I've stopped him from making a living." He had believed there was no hard feelings about what happened, despite Blackwell's claims to the contrary.

In October 2016, Blackwell received a boxing trainer's licence. In late November, he was again taken to hospital after falling seriously ill during a sparring session, with an operation performed to reduce swelling on his brain. An investigation of the events was conducted by the British Boxing Board of Control, following which cruiserweight boxer Hasan Karkardi and his trainer were both suspended from their roles after their involvement in the incident. Blackwell's former trainer Gary Lockett was unaware of the sparring session. Blackwell's brother Daniel confirmed that he regained consciousness from the coma on 23 December.

In June 2018, Blackwell made his first public appearance following the ill-fated sparring session, in support of his friend Tyson Fury at the press conference for his fight against Deontay Wilder later that year. Blackwell said his recovery was ongoing and that he had used a wheelchair for a long time.

Professional boxing record

References

External links

1990 births
Living people
People with disorders of consciousness
English male boxers
Middleweight boxers
People from Trowbridge
People with traumatic brain injuries
Sportspeople from Wiltshire
British Boxing Board of Control champions